The Case Against the Fed is a 1994 book by Murray N. Rothbard criticising the United States Federal Reserve, fractional reserve banking, and central banks in general. It details a history of fractional reserve banking and the influence that bankers have had on monetary policy over the last few centuries.

Rothbard argues that the claim that the Federal Reserve is designed to fight inflation is sophistry, that price inflation is caused only by an increase in the money supply, and that since only banks increase the money supply, then banks, including the Federal Reserve, are the only source of inflation. He writes:

Publishing History

In English 

 The Case Against the Fed. Alabama: Mises Institute, 1994;

In Portuguese 

 Pelo fim do Banco Central. Rio de Janeiro: Editora Konkin, 2022;

See also
 Austrian Business Cycle Theory

References

External links
Full versions of The Case Against the Fed, 2009 edition:
 The Case Against the Fed – full text web page
 The Case Against the Fed – full text pdf file
 The Case Against the Fed – Google Books
 The Case Against the Fed – free audio book
Full text version in Portuguese, 2021 edition:
 Pelo fim do Banco Central - full text

1994 non-fiction books
Finance books
Books by Murray Rothbard
Federal Reserve System